Kaitlyn Phillips (born 9 July 1997) is an Australian rugby league footballer who plays as a  for the Brisbane Broncos in the NRL Women's Premiership and the Tweed Heads Seagulls in the QRL Women's Premiership.

Background
Phillips was born in Orange, New South Wales and began playing rugby league for the Orange Hawks in 2018. She is of Indigenous Australian descent.

Playing career
In 2019, Phillips joined Mounties RLFC in the NSWRL Women's Premiership. In May 2019, she represented NSW Country at the Women's National Championships. On 11 October 2019, she represented the Prime Minister's XIII in their win over Fiji.

In 2020, Phillips moved to the Tweed Heads Seagulls in the QRL Women's Premiership.

On 22 September 2020, Phillips joined the Sydney Roosters NRL Women's Premiership team. In Round 1 of the 2020 NRLW season, she made her debut for the Roosters in their 18–4 win over the St George Illawarra Dragons.

On 20 February 2021, she represented the Indigenous All Stars in their 24–0 loss to the Māori All Stars.

References

External links
Sydney Roosters profile

1997 births
Living people
Indigenous Australian rugby league players
Australian female rugby league players
Rugby league second-rows
Sydney Roosters (NRLW) players